Tromatobia is a genus of ichneumon wasps in the family Ichneumonidae. There are at least 4 described species in Tromatobia.

Species
 Tromatobia notator (Fabricius, 1804)
 Tromatobia ovivora (Boheman, 1821)
 Tromatobia rufopectus (Cresson, 1870)
 Tromatobia zonata (Davis, 1895)

References

Further reading

 

Pimplinae